Mount Forbes is the seventh tallest mountain in the Canadian Rockies and the tallest within the boundaries of Banff National Park. The mountain was named by James Hector in 1859 after Edward Forbes, Hector's natural history professor at the University of Edinburgh during the mid-19th century.

Mount Forbes was first ascended on August 10, 1902, by the Swiss brothers Christian and Hans Kaufmann, guiding the British gentlemen J. Norman Collie, James Outram, Hugh E.M. Stutfield, George M. Weed, and Herman Woolley. The shark tooth-shaped peak can be "predominantly seen from many parts of the range. The normal route, the NW face and the N Ridge all are well worth climbing."


Climbing routes 
There are several climbing routes for Mount Forbes, including:

 West Ridge (Normal Route) III
 North-West Face Variation III
 West Ridge of Rosita III 5.3

The most common approach route for Mount Forbes is from the Alberta side, starting at the Icefields Parkway. From there follow the old trail up the north bank of the Glacier River to the large open basin at the head of the river. Ford the Glacier river. Find the climbers trail ascending the timbered knob at the south end of the basin. Follow this trail as it climbs steeply up the knob then crosses to the west and climbs improbably up toward cliffs to the west. Eventually you climb above the canyon and then the drop slightly to the edge of the Mons Glacier. Camps can be made here or at the foot of the North Glacier of Mt. Forbes. From here, the peak can be climbed in a reasonable day. The approach takes 4 to 6 hours.
 
A faster and shorter approach is from the west via recent logging roads starting north of Golden, BC. The 4–6 hour approach mentioned above has become much longer due to deteriorating trails, and also involves a cold river crossing. Many parties take two days using this approach. For a faster approach start on the Bush logging road and follow this until . Here turn right on the Vallenciennes Road to  where you follow the left fork up the Mons road. Park just past  beside Icefall Brook. From here a trail ascends  up a gravel slope, where it traverses north on ledges above the Icefall Canyon. This ledge is on the west side of Mons Peak. From a camp here Mt. Forbes can be climbed in a day.

See also
Mountain peaks of Canada
Mountain peaks of North America
Mountain peaks of the Rocky Mountains
Mistaya Mountain for a view of Mt. Forbes from the south-east

References

Further reading

External links
 Mount Forbes photo Flickr
 Mount Forbes aerial photo PBase

Gallery

Three-thousanders of Alberta
Mountains of Banff National Park